Arka Media Works is an Indian film production and trans-media company based out of Hyderabad, known for their works in Television and Telugu cinema. Founded in 2001 by Shobu Yarlagadda, and Prasad Devineni.

Film production

Television production

Awards

References 

Film production companies based in Hyderabad, India
Mass media companies established in 2001
Indian film studios
Producers who won the Best Feature Film National Film Award
Indian companies established in 2001
2001 establishments in Andhra Pradesh